In the biblical Book of Genesis, Cain and Abel are the first two sons of Adam and Eve. Cain, the firstborn, was a farmer, and his brother Abel was a shepherd. The brothers made sacrifices to God, but God favored Abel's sacrifice instead of Cain's. Cain then murdered Abel, whereupon God punished Cain by condemning him to a life of wandering. Cain then dwelt in the land of Nod, where he built a city and fathered the line of descendants beginning with Enoch.

Genesis narrative

The story of Cain's murder of Abel and its consequences is told in :

Translation notes

Origins

Etymology 
Cain and Abel are traditional English renderings of the Hebrew names. It has been proposed that the etymology of their names may be a direct pun on the roles they take in the Genesis narrative. Abel (hbl) is thought to derive from a reconstructed word meaning 'herdsman', with the modern Arabic cognate ibil now specifically referring only to 'camels'. Cain (qyn) is thought to be cognate to the mid-1st millennium BCE South Arabian word qyn, meaning 'metalsmith'. This theory would make the names descriptive of their roles, where Abel works with livestock, and Cain with agriculture—and would parallel the names Adam and Eve.

Original appearance 
The oldest known copy of the biblical narrative is from the Dead Sea Scrolls, and dates to the first century BCE. Cain and Abel also appear in a number of other texts, and the story is the subject of various interpretations. Abel, the first murder victim, is sometimes seen as the first martyr; while Cain, the first murderer, is sometimes seen as an ancestor of evil. Some scholars suggest the pericope may have been based on a Sumerian story representing the conflict between nomadic shepherds and settled farmers. Modern scholars typically view the stories of Adam and Eve and Cain and Abel to be about the development of civilization during the age of agriculture; not the beginnings of man, but when people first learned agriculture, replacing the ways of the hunter-gatherer. It has also been seen as a depiction of nomadic conflict, the struggle for land and resources (and divine favour) between nomadic herders and sedentary farmers.

Academic theologian Joseph Blenkinsopp holds that Cain and Abel are symbolic rather than real. Like almost all of the persons, places and stories in the Primeval history (the first eleven chapters of Genesis), they are mentioned nowhere else in the Hebrew Bible, a fact that suggests that the History is a late composition attached to Genesis to serve as an introduction. Just how late is a matter for dispute: the history may be as late as the Hellenistic period (first decades of the 4th century BCE), but the high level of Babylonian myth behind its stories has led others to date it to the Babylonian exile (6th century BCE). A prominent Mesopotamian parallel to Cain and Abel is the Sumerian myth of the Courtship of Inanna and Dumuzid, in which the shepherd Dumuzid and the farmer Enkimdu compete for the affection of the goddess Inanna, with Dumuzid (the shepherd) winning out. Another parallel is Enlil Chooses the Farmer-God, in which the shepherd-god Emesh and the farmer-god Enten bring their dispute over which of them is better to the chief god Enlil, who rules in favor of Enten (the farmer).

Christian interpretation

Islamic interpretation

The story appears in the Quran 5:27-31:

The story of Cain and Abel has always been used as a deterrent from murder in Islamic tradition. Abdullah ibn Mas'ud reported that Muhammad said in a hadith:

Muslim scholars were divided on the motives behind Cain's murder of Abel, and further why the two brothers were obliged to offer sacrifices to God. Some scholars believed that Cain's motives were plain jealousy and lust. Both Cain and Abel desired to marry Adam's beautiful daughter, Aclima (Arabic: Aqlimia). Seeking to end the dispute between them, Adam suggested that each present an offering before God. The one whose offering God accepted would marry Aclima. Abel, a generous shepherd, offered the fattest of his sheep as an oblation to God. But Cain, a miserly farmer, offered only a bunch of grass and some worthless seeds to him. God accepted Abel's offering and rejected Cain's—an indication that Abel was more righteous than Cain, and thus worthier of Aclima. As a result, it was decided that Abel would marry Aclima. Cain, on the other hand, would marry her less beautiful sister. Blinded by anger and lust for Aclima, Cain sought to get revenge on Abel and escape with Aclima.

According to another tradition, the devil appeared to Cain and instructed him how to exact revenge on Abel. "Hit Abel's head with a stone and kill him," whispered the devil to Cain. After the murder, the devil hurried to Eve shouting: "Eve! Cain has murdered Abel!". Eve did not know what murder was or how death felt like. She asked, bewildered and horrified, "Woe to you! What is murder?". "He [Abel] does not eat. He does not drink. He does not move [That's what murder and death are]," answered the Devil. Eve burst out into tears and started to wail madly. She ran to Adam and tried to tell him what happened. However, she could not speak because she could not stop wailing. Since then, women wail broken-heartedly when a loved one dies. A different tradition narrates that while Cain was quarreling with Abel, the devil killed an animal with a stone in Cain's sight to show him how to murder Abel.

After burying Abel and escaping from his family, Cain got married and had children. They died in Noah's flood among other tyrants and unbelievers.

Some Muslim scholars puzzled over the mention of offerings in the narrative of Cain and Abel. Offerings and sacrifices were ordained only after the revelation of Tawrat to Musa. This led some scholars, such as Sa'id ibn al-Musayyib, to think that the sons of Adam mentioned in the Quran are actually two Israelites, not Cain and Abel.

Gnostic interpretation 
In the Apocryphon of John, a work used in Gnosticism, Cain and Abel are Archons, being the offspring of the lesser god or Demiurge called Yaldabaoth, placed over the elements of fire, wind, water and earth. In this narrative their true names are Yahweh and Elohim, but they are given their earthly names as a form of deception.

Legacy and symbolism 

Allusions to Cain and Abel as an archetype of fratricide appear in numerous references and retellings, through medieval art and Shakespearean works up to present day fiction.

A millennia-old explanation for Cain being capable of murder is that he may have been the offspring of a fallen angel or Satan himself, rather than being from Adam.

A treatise on Christian Hermeticism, Meditations on the Tarot: A Journey into Christian Hermeticism, describes the biblical account of Cain and Abel as a myth, in that it expresses, in a form narrated for a particular case, an "eternal" idea. It argues that brothers can become mortal enemies through the very fact that they worship the same God in the same way. According to the author, the source of religious wars is revealed. It is not the difference in dogma or ritual which is the cause, but the "pretention to equality" or "the negation of hierarchy."

There were other, minor traditions concerning Cain and Abel, of both older and newer date. The apocryphal Life of Adam and Eve tells of Eve having a dream in which Cain drank his brother's blood. In an attempt to prevent the prophecy from happening the two young men are separated and given different jobs.

Cultural references 

Like other prominent biblical figures, Cain and Abel appear in many works of art, including works by Titian, Peter Paul Rubens and William Blake.

Multiple plays also showcase similar stories. In William Shakespeare's Hamlet, the characters King Claudius and King Hamlet are parallels of Cain and Abel. Lord Byron also rewrote and dramatized the story in his own play Cain (1821), viewing Cain as symbolic of a sanguine temperament, provoked by Abel's hypocrisy and sanctimony. The 2008 Danish stage play Biblen discusses and reenacts various Biblical stories, including Abel's murder by Cain.

Many novels feature the characters, or are closely based on them. Miguel de Unamuno's 1917 novel Abel Sánchez: A Story of a Passion is a re-telling of the Cain and Abel story. John Steinbeck's 1952 novel East of Eden (also a 1955 film) refers in its title to Cain's exile and contains discussions of the Cain and Abel story which then play out in the plot. James Baldwin's 1957 short story, "Sonny's Blues", has been seen as alluding to the Cain and Abel story. Author Daniel Quinn, first in his novel Ishmael (1992) and later in The Story of B (1996), proposes that the story of Cain and Abel is an account of early Semitic herdsmen observing the beginnings of what he calls totalitarian agriculture, with Cain representing the first 'modern' agriculturists and Abel the pastoralists.

They have also featured in TV series and, if allegorically, on the big screen. In Dallas (1978), Bobby and J.R. Ewing have been described as variations of Cain and Abel. More direct references include the appearance of Cain and Abel as characters in DC Comics since the 1950s. In 1989, Neil Gaiman made the two recurring characters in his comic series The Sandman. In Darren Aronofsky's allegorical film Mother! (2017), the characters "oldest son" and "younger brother" represent Cain and Abel.

See also 
 Aclima, according to some religious traditions the oldest daughter of Adam and Eve
 Antediluvian, the time period in the biblical narratives between the fall of man and the Genesis flood
 Biblical figures in Islamic tradition
 Biblical narratives and the Qur'an
 Courtship of Inanna and Dumuzid, ancient Mesopotamian story that has been compared to the story of Cain and Abel
 Debate between sheep and grain, Sumerian creation myth that has been compared to the story of Cain and Abel
 Debate between Winter and Summer, Sumerian creation myth that has been compared to the story of Cain and Abel
 Nabi Habeel Mosque, considered to be the burial-place of Abel
 Seth, third son of Adam and Eve, their only other child mentioned by name in the Bible

Notes

References

Citations

Bibliography

Further reading 

 
 
 A Practical Christian Commentary on Cain and Abel by Friedrich Justus Knecht, London, B. Herder (1910)

External links 

 
 
  at BibleGateway.com
 Story of Cain and Abel in Sura The Table (Al Ma'ida) 
 Parallel voweled Hebrew and English (JPS 1917)
 Rashi on Genesis, Chapter 4, by Rashi
 Sanhedrin 37b, Sefaria

 
Articles about multiple people in the Bible
Bereshit (parashah)
Biblical murder victims
Biblical murderers
Book of Genesis people
Brother duos
Children of Adam and Eve